Valea Hotarului may refer to several villages in Romania:

 Valea Hotarului, a village in Dragoslavele Commune, Argeș County
 Valea Hotarului, a district in the city of Sighetu Marmației, Maramureș County